Tales from the Darkside is an American anthology horror television series created by George A. Romero. A pilot episode was first broadcast on October 29, 1983. The series was picked up for syndication, and the first season premiered on September 30, 1984. The show would run for a total of four seasons. 

Each episode is a self-contained story, which often ends with a plot twist. The series spans various genres of speculative fiction, including science fiction and fantasy in addition to horror, and many episodes have darkly comic elements.

Production

The movie Creepshow was released in 1982. It was based on the EC horror comic books of the 1950s, such as Tales from the Crypt and The Vault of Horror. In light of the film’s moderate success, its producer, Laurel Entertainment, decided to explore the potential for a television series based on the feature. However, Warner Bros. had the rights to some elements of Creepshow. Laurel chose to move forward with a series that omitted aspects of movie that were owned by Warner Bros.  The result was Tales from the Darkside, which explored the same themes as Creepshow, but discarded the framing device and other elements that were based directly on the comics. 

Some episodes were adapted from the works of well-known authors, or written by the authors themselves. Stories or teleplays by Frederik Pohl, Harlan Ellison, Clive Barker, Michael Bishop, Robert Bloch, John Cheever, Michael McDowell, and Fredric Brown were used over the course of the series. Two episodes, "Word Processor of the Gods" and "Sorry, Right Number", were based on short stories by Stephen King. The latter was adapted for television by King himself.

Opening and closing sequences
In the vein of previous anthology series The Twilight Zone and The Outer Limits, each episode opens with a montage and an unseen narrator. Several bucolic scenes are shown, morphing to a black-and-white negative image as the series title appears. 

The closing credits are displayed against the final, negative image of the opening. 

The narration is performed by Paul Sparer, and was written by Romero. The opening and closing themes are performed by Donald Rubinstein, who co-wrote the music with Erica Lindsay.

Episodes

Broadcast
In its initial run, Tribune Broadcasting syndicated Tales from the Darkside to individual television stations, most of which aired it after midnight. LBS Communications then picked it up (excluding a few episodes distributed by Lorimar-Telepictures), and reran it in barter-based syndication. Distribution rights later passed to Worldvision Enterprises, then to CBS Media Ventures after its acquisition of the Worldvision library.

Home video
The series was released on VHS with the episodes' original music. Later DVD releases altered or omitted some of this music. 

Paramount Home Entertainment, through CBS Home Entertainment (sister company to Spelling Television, the successor to Laurel), released the series on DVD, beginning on February 10, 2009. The company rereleased the complete series on Region 1 DVD in 2018. Revelation Films released the entire series in Region 2. 

An audio commentary by Executive Producer George A. Romero on the pilot episode, "Trick or Treat", as well as two unaired eplsodes, "Akhbar's Daughter" and "Attic Suite", are cited on the cover of the DVD.

Awards and nominations

Young Artist Awards

Writers Guild of America, USA

Subsequent series and movie
Tales from the Darkside executive producer Richard P. Rubinstein and his company Laurel would go on to make the horror anthology series Monsters, which premiered in 1988 and ran for three seasons, as well as Tales from the Darkside: The Movie, which was released theatrically in 1990. A sequel to the film was announced, but never made.

In November 2013, it was reported that Joe Hill, Alex Kurtzman, and Roberto Orci were developing a reboot of the series for The CW, with CBS Television Studios. In 2014, Hill said that he would serve as creative director, and guide the show. Added Hill, "Darkside is a loose reboot ... It tells stories about different characters. It also tells an ongoing story. I love the original Tales From The Darkside, The Outer Limits, and The Twilight Zone, but I think in a post-X-Files world there's really no room for a straight anthology show. There has to be more. I like stories that work like puzzle boxes, every episode is turning another facet. We have something a little like that in Darkside ... every episode is a different story but three or four episodes in, you're going, 'Wait a minute, these parts actually all go together, don't they?'"

In February 2014, The CW gave the reboot a pilot order. Shooting began on March 19 and wrapped on April 4. The CW did not pick up the series, however. It then was offered to other networks unsuccessfully.

In other media
The book Tales from the Darkside: Volume One, published in 1988, consisted of stories and episode novelizations. 

Scripts written by Hill for the proposed reboot were adapted into a four-issue comic book series published in June 2016, followed by a collection of scripts in book form in October 2016. Both the comics and the book were released by IDW Publishing.

See also
 1984 in television
 Tales from the Darkside: The Movie
 Tales from the Crypt (TV series)
 Are You Afraid of the Dark? 
 Goosebumps (TV series)

References

External links
 
 

1983 American television series debuts
1988 American television series endings
1980s American anthology television series
1980s American horror television series
1980s American comedy-drama television series
American fantasy drama television series
American horror fiction television series
Dark fantasy television series
English-language television shows
Fantasy comedy television series
First-run syndicated television programs in the United States
Horror drama television series
Television series by CBS Studios
Television series by Tribune Entertainment
Television shows adapted into comics
Television shows adapted into films